Hey Babe! may refer to:
 Hey Babe! (1980 film), a musical drama film
 Hey Babe! (1999 film), a Filipino romantic comedy film
 Hey Babe, a 1992 album by Juliana Hatfield

See also
 Hey Baby (disambiguation)